Albinas Januška (born 1960) is a Lithuanian politician.  In 1990, he was among those who signed the Act of the Re-Establishment of the State of Lithuania.

References

1960 births
Living people
Lithuanian politicians
Recipients of the Order of the Cross of Terra Mariana, 2nd Class
Signatories of the Act of the Re-Establishment of the State of Lithuania
Recipients of the Order of Prince Yaroslav the Wise, 2nd class